Emerald Lake is a freshwater lake located on the western region of the Alpine Lakes Wilderness, in King County, Washington. It is one of three lakes that are connected by stream which together form the Neckelace Valley Lakes. Emerald Lake and its surrounding lakes and peaks are a popular area for hiking, swimming, and fishing cutthroat trout and rainbow trout. Self-issued Alpine Lake Wilderness permit required for transit within the Necklace Valley area.

History
Emerald Lake is one of the Necklace Valley Lakes, which includes nearby Opal Lake and Jade Lake. The lakes form a topographic sequence that reminds of a necklace, hence the name makes reference to a necklace strung with streams in between.

See also 
 List of lakes of the Alpine Lakes Wilderness

References 

Lakes of King County, Washington
Lakes of the Alpine Lakes Wilderness
Okanogan National Forest